Targeted individual may refer to:

The subject of:
Mobbing, the bullying or harassment of an individual by a group
Gang stalking, a persecutory belief of mobbing
A targeted killing
Targeted surveillance
An individual claiming to experience electronic harassment